Phanagoria Island is the third largest island in the Zed group off the north coast of Livingston Island in the South Shetland Islands, Antarctica.  
Phanagoria island of Antarctic is named after  Phanagoria in the Maeotis Lake, today Azov Sea, the largest ancient Greek city on the Taman peninsula, spread over two plateaus along the eastern shore of the Cimmerian Bosporus. The city took its name after one of its colonists, Phanagoras, and was a large emporium for all the traffic between the coast of the Maeotian marshes and the countries on the southern side of the Caucasus. It was the eastern capital of the Bosporan Kingdom.

The island is ice-free, extending  with surface area . The area was visited by early 19th century sealers.

The island is named after the town of Phanagoria in Old Great Bulgaria (7th century).

Location

British mapping in 1968, Chilean in 1971, Argentine in 1980, Bulgarian in 2005 and 2009.

See also 
 Composite Gazetteer of Antarctica
 List of Antarctic islands south of 60° S
 SCAR
 Territorial claims in Antarctica

References

References
 Bulgarian Antarctic Gazetteer. Antarctic Place-names Commission. (details in Bulgarian, basic data in English)
 Phanagoria Island. SCAR Composite Antarctic Gazetteer

External links
 Phanagoria Island. Copernix satellite image

Islands of Livingston Island
Bulgaria and the Antarctic